This Is Alice is an American situation comedy starring nine-year-old Patty Ann Gerrity. The program aired in first-run syndication from October 1958 to August 1959, distributed by the NTA Film Network.

Synopsis
Alice Holliday is a precocious nine-year-old girl who lives in the fictional town of River Glen, Georgia (although some sources say the show was set in River Glen, New Jersey). Alice is bright and bubbly and she means well, but no matter how well-intentioned she is, her efforts always seem to backfire, leading to comic adventures and making her the female equivalent and precursor of Dennis the Menace.

Alice's father, Chet Holliday, is a newspaperman. Her mother is Clarissa Mae Holliday, and her grandfather, a former Georgia peanut farmer, is known as "The Colonel." Alice attends River Glen Elementary School, where her best friend is Sally and she also is friends with "Soapy" Weaver — a frequent co-conspirator in her adventures — and Susan Gray.

Cast
Alice Holliday...Patty Ann Gerrity
Clarissa Mae Holliday...Phyllis Coates
Chester ‘Chet’ Holliday...Tommy Farrell
Sally...Kathy Garver
Clarence ‘Soapy’ Weaver...Stephen Wootton
The Colonel...Lucien Littlefield
Susan Gray...Nancy DeCarl

Production
This Is Alice was produced by National Telefilm Associates and filmed at Desilu Productions. Sidney Salkow created, produced, and directed the series. Production of the series halted in mid-1959.

Kathy Garver,played Sally, later appeared on Family Affair.

Broadcast history
Thirty-nine episodes were produced. The series ran in first-run syndication from October 1958 to August 1959. Previously broadcast episodes continued to air as late as July 1961.

Episode status
All 39 episodes are held by the UCLA Film and Television Archive.

Episodes
SOURCES

References

External links

This Is Alice opening credits on YouTube

1958 American television series debuts
1959 American television series endings
1950s American sitcoms
Black-and-white American television shows
English-language television shows
First-run syndicated television programs in the United States
Television series by CBS Studios
Television shows set in Georgia (U.S. state)
Television series by Desilu Productions